UFC Fight Night: Rockhold vs. Philippou (also known as UFC Fight Night 35) was a mixed martial arts event held on January 15, 2014, at The Arena at Gwinnett Center in Duluth, Georgia. The event was broadcast live on Fox Sports 1, and was a live lead in to the pilot episode of The Ultimate Fighter Nations: Canada vs. Australia.

Background
The event was headlined by a middleweight bout between Luke Rockhold and Costas Philippou.

Thiago Silva was briefly linked to a bout with Ovince St. Preux at the event.  However, Silva was quickly removed from the bout for an undisclosed injury. The bout was rescheduled and was expected to take place on March 15, 2014, at UFC 171, before being cancelled entirely after Silva was arrested and released from the UFC.

Jason High was expected to face Adlan Amagov at the event.  However, Amagov was forced out of the bout due to injury and was replaced by promotional newcomer Beneil Dariush. In turn, High was forced out of the bout with appendicitis and was replaced by returning veteran Charlie Brenneman.

Results

Bonus awards
The following fighters were awarded $50,000 bonuses.

 Fight of The Night: Yoel Romero vs. Derek Brunson
 Knockout of The Night: Luke Rockhold
 Submission of the Night: Cole Miller

Reported payout
The following is the reported payout to the fighters as reported to the Georgia Athletic and Entertainment Commission. It does not include sponsor money and also does not include the UFC's traditional "fight night" bonuses.

Luke Rockhold: $80,000 (includes $40,000 win bonus) def. Costas Philippou: $23,000
Brad Tavares: $32,000 (includes $16,000 win bonus) def. Lorenz Larkin: $26,000
T.J. Dillashaw: $28,000 (includes $14,000 win bonus) def. Mike Easton: $14,000
Yoel Romero: $28,000 (includes $14,000 win bonus) def. Derek Brunson: $19,000
John Moraga: $34,000 (includes $17,000 win bonus) def. Dustin Ortiz: $10,000
Cole Miller: $56,000 (includes $28,000 win bonus) def. Sam Sicilia: $10,000
Ramsey Nijem: $28,000 (includes $14,000 win bonus) def. Justin Edwards: $10,000
Elias Silverio: $10,000 (includes $10,000 win bonus) def. Isaac Vallie-Flagg: $12,000
Trevor Smith: $16,000 (includes $8,000 win bonus) def. Brian Houston: $8,000
Louis Smolka: $16,000 (includes $8,000 win bonus) def. Alptekin Özkılıç: $10,000
Vinc Pichel: $16,000 (includes $8,000 win bonus) def. Garrett Whiteley: $8,000
Beniel Dariush: $16,000 (includes $8,000 win bonus) def. Charlie Brenneman: $10,000

See also
List of UFC events
2014 in UFC

References

UFC Fight Night
2014 in mixed martial arts
Mixed martial arts in Georgia (U.S. state)
Sports in Duluth, Georgia
2014 in sports in Georgia (U.S. state)
January 2014 sports events in the United States
Events in Duluth, Georgia